Augusta Township is one of the fourteen townships of Carroll County, Ohio, United States. As of the 2020 census it had a population of 1,531.

Geography
Located in the northern part of the county, it borders the following townships:
West Township, Columbiana County - north
East Township - east
Washington Township - south
Harrison Township - southwest corner
Brown Township - west
Paris Township, Stark County - northwest corner

No municipalities are located in Augusta Township, although the unincorporated community of Augusta lies in the township's east.

Ohio State Route 9 passes through the township, leading southwest  from Augusta village to Carrollton, the county seat, and northeast  to Hanoverton.

Name and history
It is the only Augusta Township statewide. Augusta Township was formally part of Columbiana County until the creation of Carroll county in 1833.

Government

The township is governed by a three-member board of trustees, who are elected in November of odd-numbered years to a four-year term beginning on the following January 1. Two are elected in the year after the presidential election and one is elected in the year before it. There is also an elected township fiscal officer, who serves a four-year term beginning on April 1 of the year after the election, which is held in November of the year before the presidential election. Vacancies in the fiscal officership or on the board of trustees are filled by the remaining trustees.

Education
Students attend the Minerva Local School District in the Northwestern part and Carrollton Exempted Village School District in most of the township.

References

External links
County website

Townships in Carroll County, Ohio
Townships in Ohio